Olympic City Giants were a professional basketball team based in Oldham, England. Previously based in Bolton and Bury, the team were known as Bolton & Bury Hawks and then Bolton & Bury Giants, the team were founder members of the British Basketball League in 1986.

After an eighth-place finish in the 1987–88 Carlsberg League campaign, Giants qualified for their first and only BBL-era Play-off. They drew top seed Glasgow Rangers, and were soundly beaten in both games of the bet-of-three series by the regular season Champions.

In 1988 after encountering several financial difficulties, Olympic City Giants formally merged with Manchester Eagles (formerly Manchester United) to become Manchester Giants, marking a return of the famous name after a three-year absence, following a merger between the original Manchester Giants and Manchester United in 1985.

Season-by-season records

Notable former players
 Ed Bona
 Jimmy Brandon
 Terry Crosby
 Steve Nelson
 Robbie Peers
 Kenny Scott
 Cleveland Woods
 Lee Martin

See also
 British Basketball League

References

Defunct basketball teams in the United Kingdom
1981 establishments in England
Basketball teams disestablished in 1989
Basketball teams established in 1981
1989 disestablishments in England
Sport in the Metropolitan Borough of Bury
Sport in Bolton
Sport in Oldham
Former British Basketball League teams